The 1873 Massachusetts gubernatorial election was held on November 4, 1873. Republican Governor William B. Washburn was re-elected to a third term in office over Democrat William Gaston.

General election

Results

See also
 1873 Massachusetts legislature

References

Governor
1873
Massachusetts
November 1873 events